Valentine Dell (November 8, 1829 - October 10, 1885) was an educator, newspaper editor and publisher, politician, and U.S. marshal in Arkansas. He served terms in the Arkansas Senate and helped establish Fort Smith's first free public school system. He immigrated to the United States from Germany. He eventually settled in Fort Smith. He had several children including a son Valentine Dell Jr.

He published the New Era in Fort Smith.

References

1829 births
1885 deaths
Educators from Arkansas
United States Marshals
Editors of Arkansas newspapers
German emigrants to the United States
Politicians from Fort Smith, Arkansas
Arkansas state senators
People from Weinheim
Burials in Arkansas